Sidayu is a sub-district (id:kecamatan) in Gresik Regency, Indonesia. The district lays to the north of Gresik. The district has a long history associated with merchants.

References 

Gresik Regency